Đurđa Ivezić (17 October 1936 – 11 December 2020) was a Croatian film, television and stage actress.

Biography
Ivezić voiced Betty Rubble in the Croatian synchronization(dubbing) of  The Flintstones and Smurfette in The Smurfs.

She died from COVID-19 during the COVID-19 pandemic in Croatia.

Filmography

Television roles 
 "Smogovci" as Bor (voice) (1996)
 "Smogovci" as Cook (1983)
 "Vrijeme ratno i poratno" (1975)
 "Ljubav na bračni način" (1970)

Movie roles 
 "Čarobnjakov šešir" as various characters (1990)
 "Čudesna šuma" as various characters (1986)
 "Motel mjesečina" (1976)
 "Reakcionari" (1975)
 "Teret dokaza" (1972)
 "Stanica tel" (1970)
 "Brak je uvijek riskantna stvar" (1970)
 "Meteor" (1969)
 "Sedma zapovjed božja - kradi malo manje!" (1967)
 "Nastavak slijedi" (1966)
 "Druga strana medalje" (1965)
 "Sve same varalice" (1964)
 "Poštar zvoni dva puta" (1960)
 "H-8" as Alma Novak (1958)

References

External links
 

1936 births
2020 deaths
Actresses from Zagreb
Croatian actresses
Croatian television actresses
Croatian film actresses
Croatian stage actresses
Deaths from the COVID-19 pandemic in Croatia
Burials at Miroševac Cemetery